The National Provincial Championship, or NPC, was the predecessor to the current Air New Zealand Cup and Heartland Championship in New Zealand rugby. 1979 was the fourth year of the National Provincial Championship, Counties were the winners of Division 1.

Division 1 Standings

These were the NPC Division 1 standings for the 1979 season.

Table notes
Pld = Played
W   = Win
D   = Draw
L   = Loss
PF   = For (Total points scored)
PA   = Against (Total points scored against)
PD = Points difference

Promotion/Relegation
As the bottom placed North Island team, Taranaki were automatically relegated.

Division Two North winner Hawkes Bay were promoted to Division One.

Otago faced Division Two South winner Marlborough, defeating them 15-13, and remained in Division One.

Division Two Teams
Division 2 North (In Order of Final Placing)

Division 2 South (In Order of Final Placing)

Ranfurly Shield
North Auckland began the season as holders having defeated Manawatu the season before. They defended the Shield in 5 matches before being defeated by Auckland. Auckland then successfully defended against Counties in the final match of the season that pitted the Shield holders against the National Champions.

North Auckland
beat King Country      21-6
beat Thames Valley     35-6  
beat Marlborough       29-6
beat South Canterbury  20-12
beat Taranaki          23-11
lost to Auckland     3-9

Auckland
beat Counties          11-9

National Provincial Championship
1